Sιtι (Sitigo) is a Gurunsi (Gur) language of Ghana. It has been mistaken for a dialect of Vagla.

References

Languages of Ghana
Gurunsi languages